The Men's Open competition at the 2010 World Judo Championships was held at 13 September at the Yoyogi National Gymnasium in Tokyo, Japan. 67 competitors contested for the medals, being split in 4 Pools where the winner advanced to the medal round.

Pool A
Last 32 fights:
 Eric Anderson 000 vs.  Mohammad Reza Roudaki 110
 Robert Zimmermann 013 vs.  Kim Sung-Min 002

Pool B
Last 32 fight:  Islam El Shehaby 020 vs.  Rju Mijalkovic 000

Pool C
Last 32 fight:  Beibit Istybayev 000 vs.  Oscar Brayson 101

Pool D
Last 32 fight:  Martin Pacek 000 vs.  Milan Disovic 010

Repechage

Finals

References

 Results

External links
 
 Official Site 

M999
World Judo Championships Men's Openweight